Cliff Donald Parsley (born December 26, 1954 in Kansas City, Missouri) is a former punter for the National Football League (NFL). He played for the Houston Oilers from 1977-1982. He played college football at Oklahoma State and was selected to the Big 8 All-decade team for the 1970s.

References

1954 births
Living people
Players of American football from Kansas City, Missouri
American football punters
Oklahoma State Cowboys football players
Houston Oilers players